Craspedoxantha indica is a species of tephritid or fruit flies in the genus Craspedoxantha of the family Tephritidae.

Distribution
Pakistan, India.

References

Tephritinae
Insects described in 1960
Diptera of Asia